Mammaglobin-A also known as secretoglobin family 2A member 2 is a protein that in humans is encoded by the SCGB2A2 gene.

Function 
SCGB2A2 is a member of the superfamily of  secretoglobins, a group of small dimeric secreted and sometimes glycosylated proteins. Expressed mainly in mucosa, secretoglobins seem to be involved in cell signalling, immune response, and chemotaxis, and may also serve as transporters for steroid hormones in humans.

Clinical significance 

SCGB2A2 expression is highly specific of mammary tissue, and is increasingly used for identification and detection of disseminated breast cancer cells.

References

Further reading 

 
 
 
 
 
 
 
 
 
 
 
 
 
 

Human proteins